Comet is the name of two fictional comic book characters owned by DC Comics whose adventures have been published by that same company. The first character was a sapient horse with magical powers who was once a centaur in ancient Greece. The second character is a shapeshifter with three forms (male, female, and winged centaur). Both characters are connected to the Superman family of titles.

Comet first appeared in the story "The Legion of Super-Traitors!", published in Adventure Comics #293 (February 1962) during the period known as the Silver Age of Comics. This story introduced the Legion of Super-Pets, bringing together several previously established super animals. Krypto the Super-Dog came from Superman's past, Streaky the Supercat and Beppo the Super-Monkey from Superman's present—and Comet was presented as a super-pet who came from the future. "Yes, readers!" a caption declared, "This is a PREVIEW GLIMPSE of a super-pet Supergirl will own some day in the future!" The horse was properly introduced seven months later, when Comet met Supergirl in Action Comics #293 (September 1962).

Due to the events depicted in the 1985 limited series Crisis on Infinite Earths, the first character's stories were no longer considered to be canon within DC's main shared universe, known as the DC Universe, for almost 40 years. However, Comet returned to continuity in the limited series Supergirl: Woman of Tomorrow (published 2021-2022), where he sacrificed his life in the 8th issue to save Supergirl.

Pre-Crisis Comet
Comet the Super-Horse is a fictional character that appears in comic books published by DC Comics. Comet was introduced in the Superboy story in Adventure Comics #293 in February 1962, then appeared regularly with Supergirl beginning in Action Comics #292 in September 1962.

Comet was one of a series of super-powered animals, including Streaky the Supercat and Beppo the Supermonkey, that were popular in DC's comics of the 1960s. Comet was Supergirl's pet horse and, while in his human form as Bill Starr, her brief boyfriend. Comet also had a brief romance with Lois Lane in her comic book.

As he described to her telepathically, he was originally a centaur in ancient Greece named Biron. The witch Circe gave him a potion to turn him fully human after he prevented an evil sorcerer poisoning her water, but by mistake made him fully horse instead due to the Sorcerer. Unable to reverse the spell, she instead gave him superpowers, including immortality. The Sorcerer asked his teacher to help him against Biron and they were able to imprison him on an asteroid in the constellation of Sagittarius, which he had been born under. However, when Supergirl's rocket passed, it broke the force field, enabling him to escape. Later, after meeting Supergirl, he went on a mission with her to the planet Zerox, where a magic spell was cast that turned him into a human, but only while a comet passes through the solar system he is in. As a human, he adopted the identity of "Bronco" Bill Starr, a rodeo trick-rider, whom Supergirl fell in love with.

Comet made sporadic appearances in comic stories through the 1960s, and even became a member of the Legion of Super-Pets, a group consisting of the aforementioned super-powered animals.

A traditional equine Comet is partially seen in Legion of Three Worlds #1. He is part of a display in the museum Superboy-Prime visits. The museum does have displays of the supermen of the multiverse and the Kristin Wells Superwoman. It was initially unclear whether this meant Comet had returned to regular continuity; however the events of Supergirl: Woman of Tomorrow depicted his definitive return to continuity, although he died in the series.

Powers and abilities
Though unrelated, Comet's powers are similar to those of Superman and Supergirl, including flight, super-strength, and super-speed. He also has telepathy and telescopic vision. Apparently due to the potion Circe gave him he has the might of Jupiter, the wisdom of Athena, the speed of Mercury, and the telepathic powers of Neptune. Not being from Krypton he is unaffected by Kryptonite and red suns. Also, each time a comet passes through the solar system he is in, he turns into a man. For a brief transition period, he is once again a centaur.

Post-Crisis Comet

A very different Comet was introduced in Supergirl #14 (October 1997). This version was originally introduced as a hero with flight and cold-generation powers. Comet's appearance was unclear, as when using his powers he was surrounded by an aura of cold that made him resemble an actual comet. Comet looked like a man with three fingers, horse-like legs, long white hair, and a star mark on his forehead. There was a lot of speculation about who Comet was, but it was revealed that Comet was Andrea Martinez, a gay stand-up comic, who like her friend Linda Danvers (who could turn into Supergirl), could shape-shift between her human and super-powered forms (however, Comet's change also involved changing gender, from the female Andrea to the male Comet).

Soon, it was learned that Comet's male form was originally Andrew Jones, a (male) jockey, who had been trampled by horses and "rebuilt" by an organization called "The Stable" as a superhuman with equine DNA. He rebelled against the organization and began operating as a superhero. On one of his first missions he attempted to save a despairing Andrea Martinez (who had just come out to her parents, and been rejected) from an avalanche, but they both died. As with Matrix and Linda Danvers (who had merged into Supergirl, the Angel of Fire), this caused them to combine into one being: the Earth Angel of Love. Comet originally was in love with Supergirl, and since he was the Angel of Love, made her have feelings for him too, but she rejected him when she learned he was also a woman. This opened the door for the third Angel, Blithe, the Angel of Light, to use her powers to exploit Comet's heartbreak, and turn them against Supergirl. She enabled Comet to fully embrace their angel powers, transforming him/herself into a winged centaur.

Blithe deceived Comet into joining forces with the Carnivore (a powerful demonic creature who despised the Earth Angels, and sought their power). The Carnivore lost control, however, when Andrea abandoned her anger, learning that her mother had died, and had left a video apology for her actions. The three Earth Angels worked together to stop the Carnivore. Comet began a relationship with Blithe, since she loved both their forms (revealing that Blithe is bisexual).

Powers and abilities
Comet originally had the power of high-speed flight, and when he flew he left a freezing contrail behind him. Comet also generated a psionic aura which stimulated feelings of love in those around him. When he became an Angel of Love, he gained wings of ice, ice vision (blasts of subzero energy he released from his eyes), and a centaur-like form which gave him horse-like strength. Comet can shape-shift between his centaur form, and his female form of Andrea Martinez.

Other versions
 Pre-Crisis Comet appears in Supergirl: Cosmic Adventures in the 8th Grade. Supergirl from the 30th century gifts her younger self the horse to save the world in the past. He helps save a baffled Superman and Supergirl from Lex Luthor. When the younger Supergirl fades away due to her powers malfunctioning the horse is left with the Kara from the changed timeline, who admits she has no idea what to do with him.
 In the Elseworld story Superman: True Brit, the Kents have a horse called Comet on their farm.
 A Dark Multiverse Comet appears as a member of The Unseen overseeing the hero Sideways.

Reception
Asked in a 2006 interview if Superman's extended cast of characters in the Silver Age weakened Superman's uniqueness, Action Comics writer Gail Simone answered: "Completely disagree. While cutting away the allegedly 'silly' aspects of Superman's mythology, we quite forgot that there's likely a large potential readership that might really enjoy a story about a superbaby or a flying horse. We all thought that stuff was cornball junk that needed to go, but I'll tell you right now, a lot of young girls would like Supergirl more if she had a flying horse".

In other media 
Comet appears as a cameo in DC Super Hero Girls: Hero of the Year. He was Kara Zor-El's pet horse back on Krypton.

See also
 List of fictional horses

References

External links

Legion of Super-Heroes Roll Call: Comet
Silver Age Animals in Spandex

Animal superheroes
Characters created by Jerry Siegel
Characters created by Peter David
Comics characters introduced in 1962
Comics characters introduced in 1997
DC Comics angels
DC Comics animals
DC Comics characters who are shapeshifters
DC Comics characters who can move at superhuman speeds
DC Comics characters who have mental powers
DC Comics characters with superhuman senses
DC Comics characters with superhuman strength
DC Comics LGBT superheroes
DC Comics male superheroes
DC Comics telepaths
Fictional androgynes
Fictional centaurs
Fictional characters with ice or cold abilities 
Fictional empaths
Fictional horses
Supergirl
Legion of Super-Pets